Anders Ek (7 April 1916 – 17 November 1979) was a Swedish film actor. He was born in Gothenburg, Sweden and died in Stockholm. He was married to Birgit Cullberg and is the father of dancer Niklas Ek (born 1943), dancer Mats Ek and actress Malin Ek (twins born 1945).

Filmography

References

External links

1916 births
1979 deaths
People from Gothenburg
Eugene O'Neill Award winners
Litteris et Artibus recipients
20th-century Swedish male actors
Ek family